Eddie Enright (born 1974 in Thurles, County Tipperary) is a retired Irish sportsperson. He played hurling  with his local club Thurles Sarsfields and with the Tipperary senior inter-county team in the 1990s and 2000s. He also won three Fitzgibbon Cup medals with UCC, captaining the side in 1998. He is currently hurling with Watergrasshill GAA club in Cork.

References

1974 births
Living people
Thurles Sarsfields hurlers
Tipperary inter-county hurlers
UCC hurlers
Watergrasshill hurlers
All-Ireland Senior Hurling Championship winners